ER-Telecom is a Russian telecommunication holding company. It was the first federal telecommunication company, whose evaluation impulse has been received out of the region. The company is specialised on rendering a wide range of services for individuals and corporations. The company is active mainly in the South and Central regions of the European Russia.

Owners and leadership
The major shareholder is the Perm Financial and Industrial Group (LLC). Evgeniy Pegushin serves as Chairman of board of directors and Andrey Semerikov as CEO. The first substitute is Sergey Gusev. Sergey Gusev has been First Deputy General Director and Technical Director of CJSC ER-Telecom Holding since 2006

History
ER-Telecom was founded in March 2001 by the telephone operator CJSC EL-Svyaz (1997) and the internet service provider CJSC Raid-Internet (1997).

The company started with rendering of telephone services (regular phone services, IP-telephony for corporations, IP-telephony for individual clients, telephone cards East-West) and dial-up internet access (internet cards 2x2). In 1998, ER-Telecom was the first dial-up internet provider in the region and carried out a variety of well-known internet projects such as Perm business portal Raid.ru. In July 2002, the company started providing IP-telephone service in Perm and left the main regional operator Opened JSC Uralsvyazinform behind.

In 2003, the company managed to start the construction of the Universal City Telecommunication Network (UCTN) for 200 000 flats in the first city of the project - Perm. The general principle applied to the construction was FTTH (Optics up to Home). Within two years, three cities took part in the project (Perm, Samara and Volgograd).

Activity
In the cities of the project, ER-Telecom creates multiservice cable network of the same name as a platform for rendering all of the telecommunication services possible nowadays. ER-Telecom provides new possibilities for municipalities to realise social projects on the base of "Universal City Telecommunication Network" (UCTN) (connected with the safety, medicine services for the citizens, housing and communal services, penetration of info communications in different spheres of social life).

Nowadays the company develops telecommunication projects in 17 Russian cities: Saint-Petersburg, Perm, Chelyabinsk, Izhevsk, Kazan, Kirov, Naberezhnye Chelny, Nizhnekamsk, Nizhniy Novgorod, Novosibirsk, Omsk, Orenburg, Penza, Samara, Tyumen, Volgograd, Volzhsky and Yoshkar-Ola.

On the base of UCTN, ER-Telecom offers many different services including cable television (Dom.ru TV), high-speed broadband internet access, IP-telephony, DVB-C television (Dom.ru TV) as well as services for corporations (home office service, videoconference connection, telemetry collecting service and the like).

In January 2022 "M-Kom" Ltd, JV of ER-Telecom (75%) and Rostec (25%) founded in September 2021, bought 75% minus one share of "AKADO Holding". 25% is held by "AVK Investments", 51% and 49% of "AKADO Holding" respectively owned by "AVK Investments" and by Renova of Victor Vekselberg.

References

External links
 Official web-site

Telecommunications companies of Russia
Companies based in Perm, Russia
Russian brands